Cheiloplecton is a genus of ferns in the subfamily Cheilanthoideae of the family Pteridaceae with a single species Cheiloplecton rigidum, native to Mexico, Guatemala, El Salvador and Honduras.

References

Pteridaceae
Monotypic fern genera
Taxa named by Antoine Laurent Apollinaire Fée